Ass Cobra is the third full-length studio album by Norwegian punk rock band Turbonegro. It was first released in May 1996 on Boomba Records in Germany and in 1997 on Sympathy for the Record Industry in the United States. It was re-released in 1998 on Bitzcore Records in Germany and on Get Hip Records in the US, and in 2003 on Epitaph Records in the US and Burning Heart Records in Sweden. The album title is a reference to the AC Cobra sports car and the album cover to Pet Sounds by the Beach Boys.

Music
Ass Cobra featured a move towards mid-1970s punk and glam territory, in the style of the Dictators, Ramones and late the Stooges.

Critical reception
Patrick Kennedy of AllMusic wrote that the album "paves the way [for Apocalypse Dudes] harshly, with a sinister wash of cymbals, loud guitars and articulate riffs — think Poison Idea meets Alice Cooper. It is here also where Turbonegro developed their signature look: sailor caps, denim from head to toe, mustaches all around, and decidedly butch homoerotic accoutrements. [...] Though Turbonegro did quite a bit of recording prior to this album, this was the one that set the pace, and the one that enabled them to record their masterpiece, Apocalypse Dudes". Moshable magazine remarked that the album was "the very best in obnoxious drunk punk, already a classic buy-or-die thing!". Pitchfork rated Ass Cobra 9.0 out of 10.

Track listing
All songs composed and performed by TRBNGR except "Raggare Is a Bunch of Motherfuckers" (The Rude Kids), "Mobile Home" (The Lewd) and "Young Boys Feet" (The Dicks).
 "A Dazzling Display of Talent" – 2:01
 "The Midnight NAMBLA" – 1:36
 "Deathtime" – 2:20
 "Black Rabbit" – 1:21
 "Denim Demon" – 2:11
 "Bad Mongo" – 2:32
 "Mobile Home" – 2:05
 "I Got Erection" – 2:06
 "Just Flesh" – 3:09
 "Screwed And Tattooed" – 3:22 (bonus track on the SFTRI release only)
 "Hobbit Motherfuckers" – 1:22
 "Sailor Man" – 2:00
 "Turbonegro Hate the Kids" – 3:04
 "Imorgen Skal Eg Daue" – 2:32 [en: Tomorrow I'll Die)
 "Raggare Is a Bunch of Motherfuckers" – 3:01
 "Young Boys Feet" – 1:14 (bonus track on the SFTRI release only)

Personnel
Hank von Helvete (Hans Erik Dyvik Husby) – vocals
Pål Pot Pamparius (Pål Bøttger Kjærnes) – guitar
Rune Rebellion (Rune Grønn) – guitar
Bingo (Bengt Calmeyer) – bass guitar
Happy-Tom (Thomas Seltzer) – drums
Morten Andersen – photography
Sean Bovine – engineer
Rich Burnette – engineer
Christian A. Calmeyer – engineer
Erik Hanisch – engineer

References

1996 albums
Turbonegro albums
Burning Heart Records albums
Sympathy for the Record Industry albums